Guichen was a large protected cruiser built in the 1890s for the French Navy, the only member of her class. As such, Guichen was built with a relatively light armament of just eight medium-caliber guns, but was given a long cruising range and the appearance of a large passenger liner, which would help her to evade detection while raiding merchant shipping.

The predicted Anglo-French war that spurred Guichens design never came, and so her early career passed uneventfully. She initially served with the Mediterranean Squadron during her lengthy sea trials, followed by a stint in the Northern Squadron. She was sent to the Far East in response to the Boxer Uprising in Qing China by early 1901, returning to France the following year. Another deployment to East Asian waters came in 1905 and ended in 1907 with her return to France. She had been reduced to reserve by 1911 and saw little further activity in the following three years.

At the start of World War I in July 1914, the ship was mobilized into the 2nd Light Squadron and tasked with patrolling the western end of the English Channel. Guichen was transferred to the Mediterranean Sea in May 1915, serving initially with the main French fleet that blockaded the Austro-Hungarian Navy in the Adriatic Sea. Later in the year, she was reassigned to the Syrian Division that patrolled the coast of Ottoman Syria, where she helped to evacuate some 4,000 Armenian civilians fleeing the Armenian genocide. By 1917, she had been reduced to a fast transport operating between Italy and Greece. After the war, she continued transport duties, but after her crew mutinied in 1919, she was recalled to France, where she was eventually struck from the naval register in 1921 and broken up.

Background and design

In the mid-1880s, elements in the French naval command argued over future warship construction; the  advocated building long-range and fast protected cruisers for use as commerce raiders on foreign stations while a traditionalist faction preferred larger armored cruisers and small fleet scouts, both of which were to operate as part of the main fleet in home waters. The latter course required a direct challenge to the larger British Royal Navy, and the proponents of the  hoped to avoid the significant expense of an arms race by attacking Britain indirectly, by way of attacks on her merchant shipping.

These debates took place in the context of shifting geopolitical alliances and rivalries. The early 1890s was marked by serious strategic confusion in France; despite the Franco-Russian Alliance of 1891, which should have produced friction between the two countries and their imperial rival Britain, the French Navy was still oriented against the German-led Triple Alliance. This outlook was cemented in the naval program of 1894, but even the Navy's strategic planning remained muddled. These vessels were ideally suited to attack the extensive merchant shipping network of Britain, not the continental powers of Germany or Austria-Hungary. 

Because the vessel was not intended to engage enemy cruisers, armament and armor could be kept light for a ship of this size. The  (Council of Works) issued its more detailed list of specifications to shipyards on 18 December 1894 to solicit design proposals.

He had originally intended for Guichen to have an inverted bow like Dupuy de Lôme, but the  requested a straight bow instead.

Both ships were intended to resemble passenger liners, which would help them evade discovery while conducting commerce raiding operations. The French cruisers suffered from several defects, however, including insufficient speed to catch the fast transports that would be used to carry critical materiel in wartime and their vast expense militated against their use to attack low-value shipping. Additionally, their weak armament precluded their use against enemy cruisers.

Characteristics

She displaced . Her hull featured a straight stem and a pronounced tumblehome shape, as was typical for French warships of the period. She had a spar deck that extended for most of the length of the vessel. Guichens superstructure consisted of a main conning tower forward with a small bridge structure atop it and a smaller secondary conning tower aft. She was fitted with three light pole masts for signaling purposes, though the center mast, serving as a support to Temperley coaling booms, was damaged in an accident in 1906 and was cut down an converted into a ventilation shaft. She was equipped with six searchlights. Her crew ranged from 594 to 604 officers and enlisted men.

The ship's propulsion system consisted of three vertical triple-expansion steam engines driving three screw propellers; she was the first French protected cruiser to adopt a three-shaft arrangement. Steam was provided by thirty-six mixed oil- and coal-burning, Lagrafel d'Allest water-tube boilers. These were divided into two widely-spaced groups and both groups were ducted into a pair of funnels.

Despite her large size, Guichen carried a relatively light armament, since she was intended to engage unarmed merchant vessels, not other cruisers. Her main battery consisted of two  M1893 45-caliber (cal.) quick-firing (QF) gun in single pivot mounts, fore and aft on the centerline, which fired a variety of shells, including solid cast iron projectiles, and explosive armor-piercing (AP) and semi-armor-piercing (SAP) shells. These guns were supported by a secondary battery of six  M1893 45-cal. QF guns carried in sponsons, three guns per broadside. For close-range defense against torpedo boats, she was armed with a battery of ten  3-pounder Hotchkiss guns and five  1-pounder guns. The ship was also armed with a pair of  torpedo tubes in her hull above the waterline.

Armor protection consisted of Harvey steel. An anti-splinter deck was above the flat portion of the main deck with a cofferdam connecting it to the main deck. The ship's main guns were each fitted with gun shields that were 55 mm thick.

Service history

Guichen was built at the  shipyard in Saint-Nazaire; the order was placed on 9 October 1895 and her keel was laid down there in late May 1896. The ship was launched on 26 October 1897, and she was commissioned for sea trials on 10 October 1898. On 4 December, she left Saint-Nazaire for Toulon, where she was to conduct her trials; she arrived there five days later, and began her evaluations in January 1899. Troubles during her sea trials necessitated alterations to the ship, which delayed her joining the fleet. After tests in June 1899 where she failed to meet her design speed, the decision was made to replace her screws, along with other corrections. Though she was still not in full commission in 1899, Guichen was assigned to the Mediterranean Squadron, France's primary battle fleet. At that time, the unit consisted of six pre-dreadnought battleships, three armored cruisers, seven other protected cruisers, and several smaller vessels. Further evaluations were carried out through early 1900, including a test on 10 February to determine the speed developed using only the outboard propellers. Finally, on 9 March, she was placed in full commission. 

On 17 April, Guichen was transferred to the Northern Squadron, based in the English Channel, though she remained there only briefly. On 23 June, she was ordered to East Asia in response to the Boxer Uprising in Qing China. By early 1901, eight other cruisers were assigned to the station. Fighting continued in Zhili province into February. With the fighting in China having been suppressed by late in the year, Guichen returned to France, arriving on 17 October, having traveled in company with the armored cruiser .  In 1902, Guichen took part in a visit of President Émile Loubet in Petersburg in Russia (along with Montcalm and smaller ships), and in 1903 she caried President Loubet to Dover. She returned to service with the Northern Squadron in 1903, which was kept in commission for six months of the year. She remained in the unit in 1904, but later that year, she was decommissioned so her crew could be used to commission the new armored cruiser .

The ship returned to service for another tour in East Asia in 1905; during this period, her crew observed the Russian Second Pacific Squadron pass through Cam Ranh Bay in French Indochina in May on its way to the Battle of Tsushima of the Russo-Japanese War. By 1906, Guichen had become the flagship of the Naval Division of the Far East and Western Pacific. She lost her center mast, broken on 25 June, during coaling in Chefoo. She served as the flagship until 15 August, when D'Entrecasteaux arrived to relieve her. Guichen returned to France later that year. The unit was based in Brest. Guichen served as a training ship for sail makers and carpenters at Brest in 1912 and 1913.

World War I

After the start of World War I in August 1914, Guichen was assigned to the 2nd Light Squadron, which at that time consisted of the armored cruisers , Amiral Aube, Jeanne d'Arc, ,Gueydon, and Dupetit-Thouars. The ships then conducted a series of patrols in the English Channel in conjunction with a force of four British cruisers.

The French began withdrawing cruisers from the Channel over the following year, particularly after the British erected the Dover Barrage, a barrier of naval mines and nets patrolled by destroyers. Guichen was among the vessels transferred to the Mediterranean in May 1915. She initially joined the main fleet, based at Malta; toward the end of the month, Italy entered the war on the side of France and the Triple Entente. The Italian fleet took over responsibility for blockading the Austro-Hungarian Navy in the Aegean Sea and the French fleet was then charged with patrolling the area between Malta and Bizerte in French Tunisia. In late July, the ships were transferred to Algiers in French Algeria.

She was then transferred to the 3rd Squadron in the eastern Mediterranean and took part in a blockade of the Syrian coast, then part of the Ottoman Empire. During these patrols, she cruised with Desaix and the seaplane carrier  on the northernmost section of the blockade in the vicinity of Latakia. The ships had little success, as most Ottoman shipping in the region consisted of small sailing vessels. The squadron's base at Port Said on the Suez Canal was deemed to be too far for Guichen, Desaix, and Foudre, so the French occupied the small island of Arwad to secure a closer anchorage. On 12 and 13 September, Guichen participated in the evacuation of some 4,000 Armenians from the city of Antioch, along with Amiral Charner, Desaix, D'Estrées, Foudre, and the British seaplane carrier . Guichen under Commander Jean-Joseph Brisson was the first vessel to observe distress signals that had been sent by the Armenians, who had been pursued by Ottoman forces during the Armenian genocide and besieged on Musa Dagh mountain. The French and British ships transported the evacuees to Port Said. Guichen herself transported almost half the overall number: 1,941 or 1,952 refugees.

In late 1915, the 3rd Squadron was reorganized and new ships replaced Guichen. In April 1916, Guichen and Desaix were sent to Dakar in French Senegal to replace the 3rd Light Division. Guichen remained on the station only briefly, as a reorganization of the fleet's cruisers saw her replaced by the armored cruisers  and Kléber by July. In August, Guichen was outfitted at Brest for use as a troop transport, the primary alterations being the installation of additional cooking spaces and the fitting of more lifeboats. The following month, she began carrying troops around the Mediterranean, including Russian and Serbian soldiers to Salonika, Greece. She also brought troops to Itea and Corfu in Greece, among other locations. These duties continued through the end of the war.

Postwar
Following the war, she continued her troop transport duties, but by 1919, the conditions aboard the ship had become serious. In June, Guichen had withdrawn to the Gulf of Patras in western Greece, where her crew mutinied over the seemingly endless monotony and the poor conditions aboard the ship; Charles Tillon, who later led the Communist Party of France, played a significant role in the mutiny. Unrest also broke out among numerous French vessels, including in home ports, the North Sea, and elsewhere, owing to war weariness, a desire to return home, dissatisfaction with inequality aboard the ships, and anger with the fleet's anti-communist operations. The French authorities resorted to sending a battalion of Senegalese Tirailleurs to board Guichen and restore order. The ship thereafter returned to Brest, where she was laid up for boiler repairs, but by November 1920, she had been allocated to the reserve fleet in Landévennec. Guichen was decommissioned in March 1921 and condemned for disposal on 12 November. She was struck from the naval register on the 29th before being sold on 11 March 1922 at Brest.

Notes

References
 
 
 
 
 
 
 
 
 
 
 
 
 
  
 
 
 
 
 
 
 

Cruisers of the French Navy
Ships built in France
1897 ships
Guichen